Tabourie Lake, formerly Toubouree Lake is a small village in the suburb of , in the South Coast region of New South Wales, Australia and is within the City of Shoalhaven local government area. The village takes its name from the lagoon formed at the entry of Tabourie Creek into the ocean. Crampton Island lies immediately off shore with access available by foot at low tide. A caravan and camping park is located between the beach and lake. The village boasts a small museum, opened in 1965 with a collection of local historical exhibits, including fauna, Aboriginal artifacts, and historical furnishings and machinery. The museum and collection was given to the Shoalhaven City Council by its founder Jack Nicholson in 1983.

Tabourie Lake is served on weekdays by Ulladulla Bus Lines. Route 741 runs twice daily south to Kioloa and north to Ulladulla. An additional afternoon service is provided on school days.

References

Towns in the South Coast (New South Wales)
City of Shoalhaven
Coastal towns in New South Wales